Freakshow is the second album by American glam metal band BulletBoys. It was released in 1991 by Warner Bros. Records. It is the follow-up to their successful self-titled debut. 

The album peaked at Number 69 on the Billboard 200. Their cover of Tom Waits's "Hang on St. Christopher" reached 22 on the Mainstream Rock chart. Videos were made for "THC Groove", "Hang on St. Christopher", and "Talk to Your Daughter". 

In 2005, Wounded Bird Records re-released the album along with the follow-up, Za-Za, on a single disc.

Critical reception
Entertainment Weekly thought that "the problem is that all [the band's] charm has no foundation to stand on; there are no hooks or memorable melodies here." The Chicago Tribune wrote: "Their cover of Tom Waits' 'Hang on St. Christopher' might make a few cringe-but then again, why would a Waits fan be listening to these guys?"

Track listing

Additional Track Listings
Some versions have a very different track listing, which reads as follows:

Singles 
Promotional singles and videos were released for the songs "THC Groove", "Hang on St. Christopher", and "Talk To Your Daughter". Their cover of Tom Waits' "Hang on St. Christopher" would go on to peak at Number 22 on the US Mainstream Rock Chart in 1991.

Personnel
Band members
 Marq Torien: Lead Vocals
 Mick Sweda: Guitar
 Lonnie Vencent: Bass
 Jimmy D'Anda: Drums
 Bobby LaKind: Congas on Hang on St. Christopher 

 Art Direction and Design: Kim Champagne
 Cover Painting: David B. McMacken

References

1991 albums
BulletBoys albums
Warner Records albums
Albums produced by Ted Templeman